Psyllopus is a genus of mites in the family Acaridae.

Species
 Psyllopus gerbillicola Fain & J. C. Beaucournu, 1993

References

Acaridae